The first table includes countries that pioneered the construction of motorways in the 20th century

Some of the portions of the Trans-African Highways are already at motorway standard.

This is a list of African countries and dependent territories sorted by motorways' total length, which is sorted by kilometers built in the 21st century.

Notes

See also
 List of African countries by population
 Trans-African Highway network
 List of Arab countries by population
 Highway systems by country
 List of member states of the Commonwealth of Nations by population
 Road signs in South Africa
 List of Middle East countries by population

Africa transport-related lists